Revenge is the second mixtape by American rapper and singer XXXTentacion, released on May 16, 2017, by Empire Distribution. It consists of eight previously released songs that were available for streaming on X's SoundCloud. It was preceded by the lead single "Look at Me", which peaked at number 34 on the US Billboard Hot 100.

Promotion
The lead single from the tape, called "Look at Me", premiered on December 30, 2015, on SoundCloud. The song was later released to iTunes as a single on January 29, 2016, until it was later re-released for digital download again with a remastered and clean version of the song on February 20, 2017, by Empire Distribution.

Critical reception

Adrian Glover of Salute Magazine lauded Revenge, giving it a full 5/5 rating, praising XXXTENTACION as music's new "jig-saw genius", and commending the musical diversity, risks and potential of the project. He also went on to further praise XXXTENTACION as "someone that could evoke Miles Davis’ weirdo genius".

Commercial performance
Revenge debuted at number 76 on the Billboard 200 for the chart dated June 3, 2017, and has since peaked at number 44. It later peaked at number 28 following XXXTentacion's death.

Track listing

Notes
 "Valentine" was the 4th track in the mixtape making the mixtape 8 tracks long, which was later removed from streaming services, due to an issue with sample clearance, making the mixtape 7 tracks long.
 "Look at Me" samples "Changes" by Mala.
 "I Don’t Wanna Do This Anymore" samples "Whitley (Part 1)" by NOVA.
 "Valentine" samples "Sweetest Kill" by Broken Social Scene.
 "Slipknot" was also released on Members Only, Vol. 3.
 "YuNg BrAtZ" samples a video of XXXTENTACION in a fight in 2016.
 "RIP Roach" samples "The Fog" by SpaceGhostPurrp.

Charts

Weekly charts

Year-end charts

Certifications

References

2017 mixtape albums
XXXTentacion albums
Albums produced by Diplo
Empire Distribution albums
Rap metal albums